Frequency is a 2019 Burmese horror film, directed by Khant Man Htal starring Eaindra Kyaw Zin and Htun Eaindra Bo. The film, produced by SY Production premiered Myanmar on July 18, 2019.

Cast
Eaindra Kyaw Zin as Ghost
Htun Eaindra Bo as Daw Thit Sar
May Po Po Chit as Nandar

References

2019 films
2010s Burmese-language films
Burmese horror films
Films shot in Myanmar